Sunnyvale, California is a city in Santa Clara County in Silicon Valley.

Sunnyvale may also refer to:

Places

America
Sunnyvale, Missouri, a former village in northern Newton County, Missouri, United States
Sunnyvale, Texas, a suburb of Dallas, Texas, United States

Australia
Sunnyvale, South Australia a locality on Yorke Peninsula

New Zealand
Sunnyvale, Auckland, a suburb of Auckland, New Zealand
Sunnyvale, Otago, a suburb of Dunedin, New Zealand
Sunnyvale Park, a sports venue in Sunnyvale, Dunedin

Arts, entertainment, and media
Sunnyvale, the original title of the romantic comedy film Opie Gets Laid
Sunnyvale, the fictional suburb from the Australian comedy TV series, Housos
Sunnyvale Trailer Park, the fictional home of the characters of Trailer Park Boys
Sunnyvale, a fictional town in the Fear Street books by R. L. Stine

See also
Sunnydale (disambiguation)